Sesan Ogunro (born 11 January 1983) is a Nigerian music video director based in the United Kingdom, often credited for his work as Sesan. He has directed music videos for Afrobeats genre artists such as D'Banj, Wizkid, Tiwa Savage and Davido. He is the CEO of Film Factory Nigeria, a video production company in Lagos; and Film Factory South Africa, in Johannesburg.

Early life
Sesan spent his early childhood in his birthplace Lagos, Nigeria before moving to the UK with his family, where he attended secondary school in London.

From music production to Djing, he always had a strong interest and passion for creativity. He took his passion in the arts forward to further studies and graduated with a degree in 3D Animation and Visual effects from the University of West London.

Sesan was inspired by his late father and namesake Sesan Ogunro Sr., who ran Eminent Communications, one of the largest advertising agencies in Lagos until his tragic passing in 2013.

Career
After university, Sesan pursued film projects in the UK urban underground scene through his co-owned production company, Mastermind Promotions which paved the way for him to branch into the mainstream arena. In 2005 he took on the role as the Head of Post Production with global advertising agency, McCann Erickson, London.

In 2007, he met Afrobeats/Afropop artist D'Banj in a nightclub in Lagos and agreed to film the video for his upcoming single, "Suddenly". Filmed in Lagos, Sesan's Afrobeat directorial debut lead to future award-winning collaborations with D’Banj. These would include the music video for "Oliver Twist", which premiered on YouTube in 2012.

The song was nominated for the World Music Award Best Video of the Year and a Channel O Music Video Awards Most Gifted Video of the Year award in 2012.

Sesan continues to work with artists in all genres such as Grammy nominated duo Riton and Kah-Lo, and has been acclaimed as one of Nigeria's most respected directors.

Selected videography
Davido ft Uhuru & DJ Buckz – The Sound
Davido ft Meek Mill - Fans Mi
Davido ft Nasty C - Coolest Kid in Africa
Davido ft Rae Sremmurd & Young Thug  - Pere
D'Banj ft Kanye West – Oliver Twist (D'banj song)
D'Banj ft Snoop Dogg – Mr Endowed
D'Banj ft Tiwa Savage – Shake It
Digital Farm Animals ft Nelly – Millionaire
Kahlo ft Riton – Ginger
Mr Eazi  - In the morning
Patoranking ft Elephant Man & Konshens – Daniella Whine
Shatta Wale – Gringo
Wizkid– Final (Baba Nla)
Wizkid – Soweto Baby
Wizkid - Tonight
Wizkid ft Mystro – Immediately
Aṣa – Good Thing
Tulisa - Daddy

Awards

Personal life
Sesan is brother to OAP and producer Fade Ogunro and they run production company, Film Factory together.

References

External links

Living people
1983 births
Nigerian music video directors
Nigerian cinematographers